Banabad (also Romanized as Banābād; also known as Banaveh and Banāābād) is a village in Melkari Rural District, Vazineh District, Sardasht County, West Azerbaijan Province, Iran. At the 2006 census, its population was 609, in 117 families.

References 

Populated places in Sardasht County